Claude Bouchiat, born 16 May 1932, is a French physicist, member of the French Academy of sciences.

Biography 

Graduate of the École Polytechnique in 1955, he was director of research at the CNRS in the theoretical physics laboratory of the École Normale Supérieure from 1971 to 2003. Claude was the disciple of Louis Michel and worked with him on the anomalous magnetic dipole moment of the muon.

He became honorary research director as of 2003.

Philippe Meyer [fr] and Claude supervised the diploma (Thèse de troisième cycle) and doctorate (Doctorat d'État) or Joël Scherk and André Neveu at University of Paris XI in Orsay.

His wife Marie-Anne Bouchiat, a physicist, and their daughter Hélène Bouchiat, also a physicist, are both members of the French Academy of sciences.

Distinctions 
 1980: Elected correspondent of the French Academy of Sciences in the Physics section
 1983: Prix Ampère de l’Électricité de France by the French Academy of sciences
 1990: Three Physicists Prize by the École normale supérieure de Paris

References

1932 births
French physicists
Academic staff of the École Normale Supérieure
École Polytechnique alumni
Members of the French Academy of Sciences
Research directors of the French National Centre for Scientific Research
Living people